Grove is a town in Allegany County, New York, United States. The population was 497 at the 2020 census. Grove is in the northeast part of Allegany County, northwest of Hornell.

History 
The town of Grove was established in 1827 as "Church Tract" from the town of Nunda in Livingston County. The town assumed its current name in 1828, possibly based on the large number of trees in the town. Grove lost its western territory to form the newer town of Granger in 1838.

Past residents of note 
Frederick Decker, the "Ossian Giant", was a resident known for his great size (7 feet, six inches, 385 pounds). He was born in Geneseo in 1836 and exhibited himself across the country before settling down in Grove where he died and was buried in 1886.

Geography

New York State Route 70 passes across the northeast part of the town.

Canaseraga Creek flows out of The Swamp (or the Swain Swamp if you are not from Swain) towards Canaseraga.

Demographics

At the 2000 census,  there were 533 people, 213 households and 148 families residing in the town. The racial make-up of the town was 97.00% White, 1.31% Native American, 0.19% Asian, 0.56% from other races and 0.94% from two or more races. Hispanic or Latino of any race were 0.94% of the population.

There were 213 households, of which 26.8% had children under the age of 18 living with them, 60.6% were married couples living together, 6.6% had a female householder with no husband present, and 30.5% were non-families. 25.4% of all households were made up of individuals and 13.6% had someone living alone who was 65 years of age or older.  The average household size was 2.50 and the average family size was 3.01.

23.1% of the population were under the age of 18, 7.7% from 18 to 24, 24.0% from 25 to 44, 29.3% from 45 to 64 and 15.9% were 65 years of age or older. The median age was 42 years. For every 100 females, there were 102.7 males. For every 100 females age 18 and over, there were 97.1 males.

The median household income was $38,750 and the median family income was $48,594. Males had a median income of $31,944 and females $26,071. The per capita income was $17,522. About 2.5% of families and 5.3% of the population were below the poverty line, including 6.7% of those under age 18 and 5.5% of those age 65 or over.

Communities and locations in Grove 
Brewers Corners – A location in the center of the town at Johnson Hill Road and Ridge Road
Grove – a hamlet near the south town line on County Route 15B (CR 15B, named Fink Hollow Road).
Rosses – a hamlet at the north town line on NY 70. Part of the hamlet is located in Livingston County.
Swain – a hamlet in the northeast corner of the town at the intersection of CR 24 and NY 70, named for Samuel Swain, a 19th-century surveyor and developer
Swain Ski Resort – a skiing and snowboarding center near Swain that is the oldest operating ski resort in the state

References

External links
 Town of Grove official website
 Grove history
 Ossian Giant note

Towns in Allegany County, New York
1827 establishments in New York (state)